Tissue remodeling is the reorganization or renovation of existing tissues. Tissue remodeling can be either physiological or pathological. The process can either change the characteristics of a tissue such as in blood vessel remodeling, or result in the dynamic equilibrium of a tissue such as in bone remodeling. Macrophages repair wounds and remodel tissue by producing extracellular matrix and proteases to modify that specific matrix.

A myocardial infarction induces tissue remodeling of the heart in a three-phase process: inflammation, proliferation, and maturation. Inflammation is characterized by massive necrosis in the infarcted area. Inflammatory cells clear the dead cells. In the proliferation phase, inflammatory cells die by apoptosis, being replaced by myofibroblasts which produce large amounts of collagen. In the maturation phase, myofibroblast numbers are reduced by apoptosis, allowing for infiltration by endothelial cells (for blood vessels) and cardiomyocytes (heart tissue cells). Usually, however, much of the tissue remodeling is pathological, resulting in a large amount of fibrous tissue. By contrast, aerobic exercise can produce beneficial cardiac tissue remodeling in those suffering from left ventricular hypertrophy.

Programmed cellular senescence contributes to beneficial tissue remodeling during embryonic development of the fetus.

In a brain stroke the penumbra area surrounding the ischemic event initially undergoes a damaging remodeling, but later transitions to a tissue remodeling characterized by repair.

Vascular remodeling refers to a compensatory change in blood vessel walls due to plaque growth. Vascular expansion is called positive remodeling, whereas vascular constriction is called negative remodeling.

Tissue remodeling occurs in adipose tissue with increased body fat. In obese subjects, this remodeling is often pathological, characterized by excessive inflammation and fibrosis.

See also
Collagen hybridizing peptide, a molecular marker to directly image tissue remodeling

References

Tissue engineering